Secane station is a SEPTA Regional Rail station in Secane, Pennsylvania. It serves the Media/Wawa Line and previously served the Pennsylvania Railroad. It is located at Providence Road and South Avenue, and parking is available via permit.

The station consists of two platforms with shelters on the east side of Providence Road across from the end of South Street. A serpentinite stone building originally built in 1880 by the Pennsylvania Railroad serves as the station and ticket office, with an insurance office occupying the level at the parking lot.  The station opened as Spring Hill, retaining that name until 1886. The previous name can still be found on the cornerstone of the building.

Improvements
In September 2019 SEPTA completed a series of upgrades to this station. The upgrades include the installation high-level platforms and a new station building and canopy. The Secane station upgrade was made possible by funding provided by the Commonwealth's Act 89 funds.

Station layout
Secane has two high-level side platforms.

References

External links

 Secane Station | SEPTA
 Station from Providence Road from Google Maps Street View

SEPTA Regional Rail stations
Stations on the West Chester Line
Former Pennsylvania Railroad stations
Railway stations in the United States opened in 1880
1880 establishments in Pennsylvania